Mariette Schmit (born 4 September 1953) is a Luxembourgian fencer. She competed in the women's individual épée event at the 1996 Summer Olympics.

References

External links
 

1953 births
Living people
Sportspeople from Luxembourg City
Luxembourgian female épée fencers
Olympic fencers of Luxembourg
Fencers at the 1996 Summer Olympics